Yuruarí River is a river of Venezuela. It is part of the Essequibo River basin.

See also
List of rivers of Venezuela

References
Rand McNally, The New International Atlas, 1993.

Rivers of Venezuela
Geography of Bolívar (state)